The 2022 IFSS On-Snow World Championships were held in Hamar, Norway from February 23 to February 27, 2022.

Medal summary

Men

Women

Mixed

Medals table

External links
 Official website
 Results

Dog sledding races
IFSS On-Snow World Championships
International sports competitions hosted by Norway
IFSS On-Snow World Championships